Roger Vincent (1878–1959) was a French actor who acted in over 100 movies over five decades.

Selected filmography
 The Stairs Without End  (1943)
 The White Waltz (1943)
 Her Final Role (1946)
 The Murderer is Not Guilty (1946)
Dropped from Heaven (1946)
 The Queen's Necklace (1946)
Dreams of Love (1947)
 Mandrin (1947)
 Dilemma of Two Angels (1948)
 The Woman I Murdered (1948)
 Dark Sunday (1948)
 The Agony of the Eagles (1952)
 Yours Truly, Blake (1954)
 I'll Get Back to Kandara (1956)

External links

1878 births
1959 deaths
French male silent film actors
French male film actors
20th-century French male actors